David Alan McCabe (born 3 January 1981) is an English singer, songwriter and guitarist, the frontman of The Zutons and a former member of Tramp Attack.

History
McCabe was a member of Liverpool band Tramp Attack with Brookside actor Kristian Ealey. The band released their debut single "Rocky Hangover" in 2001, before McCabe left to form The Zutons. The band released 3 albums, before quietly disbanding in 2008.

In 2008, McCabe collaborated with singer-songwriter Thea Gilmore on the song "Old Soul", which appeared on the album Liejacker.

In 2010, McCabe co-wrote the Mark Ronson single The Bike Song, which appeared on the producers 2010 album Record Collection.

In 2012, McCabe provided vocals along with the likes of Paul McCartney and Robbie Williams to The Justice Collective Hillsborough charity single, a cover version of "He Ain't Heavy, He's My Brother".

In 2015, McCabe launched his solo career with the release of his debut album Church Of Miami on 1965 Records. In contrast to previous output, the album isn't guitar based and has been compared to the likes of Kraftwerk and Depeche Mode

McCabe currently plays bass guitar in Liverpool alternative rock band SILENT-K.

Personal life
In September 2012, McCabe was found guilty of assault after headbutting and breaking the nose of a 23-year-old student in Liverpool city centre. Reportedly provoked by the victim and his friends laughing about his girlfriend's coat, McCabe claimed he was protecting himself after the group surrounded him. The victim maintained that McCabe lunged at him after overhearing the group laughing. He was given a community order and ordered to pay the victim £1,500 plus court costs of £3,500.

Discography

Albums
 Church Of Miami (2015)

References

1981 births
Living people
English male singers
English rock singers
English rock guitarists
English male guitarists
The Zutons members
Musicians from Liverpool
21st-century English singers
21st-century British guitarists
21st-century British male singers